William Sturges-Bourne PC (7 November 1769 – 1 February 1845), known as William Sturges until 1803, was a British Tory politician. He was briefly Home Secretary under George Canning in 1827.

Background and education
Born William Sturges, he was the only son of the Reverend John Sturges and his wife Judith (née Bourne). He was educated at Winchester College and Christ Church, Oxford, and was called to the bar at Lincoln's Inn in 1793. In 1803, Sturges inherited property from his uncle Francis Bourne, requiring him to add the surname Bourne to his own.

Political career
At Oxford he became good friends with George Canning, who helped him become elected to parliament for Hastings in 1798. In Pitt's second government, Sturges Bourne became Secretary to the Treasury, and, after a period out of government during the Ministry of All the Talents, he became a Lord of the Treasury from 1807 to 1809, retiring along with his ally Canning from the government. Sturges Bourne left parliament after the 1812 general election, but, due again to Canning's influence, became a Privy Councillor in 1814, and returned to parliament for Bandon Bridge in 1815.  In 1814 he became a commissioner on the Board of Control, remaining in this office until 1822.  He also served from 1818 to 1819 as Chairman of a Committee to reform the Poor Laws, which was successfully carried out as the Sturges Bourne Acts.

Although he retired from government in 1822 due to a large inheritance, he returned to government as Home Secretary when Canning became prime minister in April 1827.  He only served briefly in this post, becoming instead First Commissioner of Woods and Forests when the Whig grandee Lord Lansdowne joined the ministry as Home Secretary a few months later.  He was offered the Chancellorship of the Exchequer several times by Canning's successor Lord Goderich, but turned it down, leading Colonial Secretary William Huskisson to accuse him of sabotaging the ministry.  Sturges Bourne retired from government with Wellington's accession as premier in February 1828. Sturges Bourne supported Catholic emancipation, but opposed the Whig Reform Bill, and retired from parliament in 1831.  In his later career, he served as a member of the Royal Commission on the Poor Laws.

He was elected a Fellow of the Royal Society in April 1826

Family
Sturges Bourne married Anne, third daughter of Oldfield Bowles, in 1808. He died at Testwood House, New Forest, Hampshire, in February 1845, aged 75.

References

External links 
 

1769 births
1845 deaths
People educated at Winchester College
Alumni of Christ Church, Oxford
Tory MPs (pre-1834)
Members of the Parliament of the United Kingdom for Ashburton
Members of the Parliament of the United Kingdom for County Cork constituencies (1801–1922)
Members of the Privy Council of the United Kingdom
British Secretaries of State
UK MPs 1802–1806
UK MPs 1806–1807
UK MPs 1807–1812
UK MPs 1812–1818
UK MPs 1826–1830
UK MPs 1830–1831
Fellows of the Royal Society